Vijay Mehra may refer to:

Vijay Mehra (Indian cricketer), who played Test cricket for India
Vijay Mehra (UAE cricketer), who played one-day international cricket for the United Arab Emirates